The following is a list of media published in the Lone Wolf series of gamebooks, and other derivative media based on the gamebooks. The original gamebook series, and the bulk of subsequent Lone Wolf media, was written by Joe Dever. The success and cult status of the original gamebooks helped in the creation of a spin-off called The World of Lone Wolf, written by Ian Page, a series of novelizations, a collection of role-playing games, and a number of video games and other derivative works.

Printed media

Main gamebook series
Although they form one full series numbered 1 to 32, the Lone Wolf gamebooks are in fact subdivided in four subseries. In the Kai Series (books 1 to 5), we follow Lone Wolf as he climbs the steps to become a Kai Lord of the Magnakai level. In the Magnakai Series (books 6 to 12), Lone Wolf collects the Lorestones so he could reach the Grand Master level, the highest level a Kai Lord could achieve in the First Kai Order. In the Grand Master series (books 13 to 20), Lone Wolf discovers that there are even higher levels a Kai Lord could achieve, up to the point of Supreme Kai Master. In the New Order series (books 21 to 32), we play as a member of the Second Kai Order already at the level of a Grand Master. The yet to be published book 32 will belong to this subseries.

Kai series

Magnakai series

Grand Master series

New Order series

Spin-off gamebook series

The World of Lone Wolf
All four World of Lone Wolf books were written by Ian Page and edited by Joe Dever. In 2005 the gamebooks were made available for free download at Project Aon .

The series plays for the most part at the tip of south-eastern Magnamund, in the land then known as the Shadakine Empire, and features Grey Star, a human that was raised by the Shianti, a race of demi-gods.

According to a 2008 interview with Joe Dever, Grey Star was actually the principal character that Ian Page played in Dever's D&D campaign in the late 1970s. Since Ian Page had created a detailed backstory for Grey Star and fleshed out many aspects of southern Magnamund, Joe Dever convinced him to write a four-book story arc centered on this character, and to include his contributions in the Magnamund setting.

In February 2015, Joe Dever announced on Facebook that the World of Lone Wolf series will be republished in deluxe edition by Mantikore Verlag in German. In November 2016, Megara Entertainment launched a successful Kickstarter campaign to republish the first book of this series in English. Similar campaigns will be made for each of the remaining books.

Autumn Snow
In the years 2010–2011, the French associative editor Scriptarium published original adventures in its webzine Draco Venturus. These adventures formed the Autumn Snow series, featuring the eponymous female Kai Lord from the Second Kai Order, and is written by French-Canadian author Martin Charbonneau. In September 2014, Megara Entertainment announced that it would publish these adventures in a gamebook format, both in French and English. Joe Dever approved the series which features artwork by Gary Chalk.

Bonus adventures
With the republication of the Lone Wolf series, Mongoose Publishing decided to add a bonus adventure at the end of each gamebook, except for Flight from the Dark. This concept was continued by Mantikore-Verlag and Holmgard Press in subsequent books, except for The Dusk of Eternal Night. These bonus adventures mainly feature a supporting character of the main story of the gamebook and have their own set of rules. They were written by different authors with the approbation of Joe Dever who edited and augmented their work while he was alive. After his death, staff at Holmgard Press took over the supervising duty. Contrary to the main adventures which nearly all have 350 sections, these bonus stories don't have a fixed number of sections.

Although most of them are not linked to each other, five of these adventures form the Dire Series featuring the same character, a Talestrian soldier cursed with undeath and blessed by Kai. Equipment and abilities can be carried over during the course of this subseries.

With the release of the Collector's Edition of the Lone Wolf series, French publisher Megara Entertainment planned to also republish the World of Lone Wolf series in a Collector's Edition format with bonus adventures. However, financial woes prevented the publication of any other books past the first one.

In other languages
In Sweden, the republication of the books include brand new official bonus adventures starting with book 8. Although originally written in English, these adventures have yet to be published in that language.

In Germany, some new bonus adventures were published in certain books of the main Lone Wolf series (LW) and the spin-of World of Lone Wolf series (WoLW). One has even been published as a complete separated gamebook. Again, they have yet to be published in English. They were all written by Alexander Kühnert.

Novels

Legends of Lone Wolf

A series of novelizations by John Grant (the nom de plume of Paul Barnett) were released entitled "Legends of Lone Wolf".  They expanded on the adventures by introducing new characters (or fleshing out old ones from the book series), events and whole new stories.

Dark Quest Books announced plans to release five omnibuses containing all twelve novels. , three omnibuses can be ordered on the Dark Quest Books website.

Chronicles of Magnamund

When Mongoose Publishing announced that it would republish the Lone Wolf series of gamebooks, it was also announced that two new trilogies of novels would be written under the generic name of Chronicles of Magnamund. The first novel, The Dragons of Lencia, is part of the Lencian Trilogy, written by Richard Ford. The second novel, Glory & Greed, is part of the trilogy named Rise of the Agarashi and is written by August Hahn, author of the first official version of the Lone Wolf Roleplaying Game. Both trilogies are set in the year MS 5100, 50 years after the events described in the first gamebook of the Lone Wolf series, Flight from the Dark. Since the cancellation of the Lone Wolf line by Mongoose Publishing, nothing is known about the fate of both trilogies.

The Lencian Trilogy

The Dragons of Lencia (2008)
The Shadow & the Skull (TBA)
The Lencian Trilogy #3 (TBA)

Rise of the Agarashi

Glory & Greed (2008)
Sand & Sorrow (TBA)
Triumph & Tragedy (TBA)

Roleplaying games

d20 series

The first version of Lone Wolf: The Roleplaying Game, published by Mongoose Publishing. All the books are authored by August Hahn.

The Lone Wolf RPG
The Darklands 
Magic of Magnamund
Dawn of Destruction
Blood Moon Rising

Multiplayer gamebook

A new version of the roleplaying game, Lone Wolf Multiplayer Game Book, was released in March 2010 by Mongoose Publishing. The rules for this new version are simpler and closer to the ones of the regular gamebook series. Numerous expansions were made available in the months after the original release. Other supplements were planned and announced by Mongoose Publishing but, on 27 February 2013, it was announced that the publisher had lost its licensing rights on these books. Cubicle 7 soon picked up the rights to make a Lone Wolf roleplaying game. According to Joe Dever, Cubicle 7 will republish the original Multiplayer Gamebook and its supplements, along with the ones that were announced by Mongoose, but with additional data and a completely revised set of rules.

The Lone Wolf Multiplayer Gamebook by Joe Dever and Matthew Sprange
Terror of the Darklords by Pete Nash and Joe Dever (June 2010)
Heroes of Magnamund by Joe Dever and Matthew Sprange (July 2010)
Sommerlund by Joe Dever and Darren Pearce (October 2010)
Magnamund Bestiary by Joe Dever and Darren Pearce (January 2011)
Book of the Magnakai by August Hahn and Joe Dever (March 2011)
Corruption of Ikaya by Mark Gedak (May 2011)
The Darklands by Vincent Lazzari and Joe Dever (September 2011)
Stornlands I by Joe Dever, Vincent Lazzari, Florent Haro, Éric Dubourg, Gérald Degryse and Emmanuel Luc (August 2012)
Announced but not released:
Stornlands II by Joe Dever, Vincent Lazzari, Florent Haro, Éric Dubourg, Gérald Degryse & Emmanuel Luc 
The Kai Monastery by Joe Dever, Éric Dubourg, Vincent Lazzari & August Hahn 
Drakkarim by Joe Dever, Vincent Lazzari, Florent Haro, Éric Dubourg, Gérald Degryse & Emmanuel Luc 
Untitled supplement on Vassagonia
Untitled supplement on Durenor

The Lone Wolf Adventure Game

In April 2013, Cubicle 7 announced that they were picking up the rights to publish a Lone Wolf RPG. This new version was called The Lone Wolf Adventure Game and it contains a new version of the Lone Wolf Multiplayer Gamebook that have been "extensively reviewed, revised, and expanded upon with new material from Joe Dever, the Scriptarium team, and the Cubicle 7 team". In August 2014, a successful Kickstarter campaign took place and raised £68,005 to help funding the creation of the game. This new version was released at the end of September 2015. In July 2021, the editor announced that it was ceasing the publication

The Lone Wolf Adventure Game by Joe Dever and Cubicle 7 (September 2015)
Rookhaven by August Hahn, an add-on exclusive to the Kickstarter campaign (2016)
Heroes of Magnamund by Joe Dever and Matthew Sprange, modified by the Cubicle 7 team (Spring 2016)
Adventures of the Kai by Joe Dever and Cubicle 7 (June 2016)
Magnamund Menagerie by Joe Dever and Darren Pearce, modified by the Cubicle 7 team (February 2017)
Bestiary of the Beyond by Joe Dever and Cubicle 7 (May 2017)
Terror of the Darklords by Joe Dever and Pete Nash, modified by the Cubicle 7 team (October 2017)
The Realm of Sommerlund by Joe Dever and Darren Pearce, modified by the Cubicle 7 team (2018)

Other books

Video games

Other media

References

Fantasy gamebooks
Gamebooks
Lone Wolf (gamebooks)
Series of books
Novels based on games